Dismemberment is a stage illusion, designed and patented by the magician Edward M. Massey in 1935.

Basic Effect

Exposure
The Masked Magician (Val Valentino) performed the Dismemberment and revealed the method in Breaking the Magician's Code: Magic's Biggest Secrets Finally Revealed (2008).

References
 U.S. Patent 2034407

External links
 Patent description on Google Patents

Magic tricks